Nar Maya Dhakal is a Nepali politician and a member of the House of Representatives of the federal parliament of Nepal. She was elected from Rastriya Janata Party Nepal under the proportional representation system.

References

Living people
21st-century Nepalese women politicians
21st-century Nepalese politicians
Khas people
Rastriya Janata Party Nepal politicians
Place of birth missing (living people)
Nepal MPs 2017–2022
1982 births